The canton of Breteuil is an administrative division of the Eure department, northern France. Its borders were modified at the French canton reorganisation which came into effect in March 2015. Its seat is in Breteuil.

It consists of the following communes:

Ambenay
Les Baux-de-Breteuil
Bémécourt
Bois-Anzeray
Bois-Arnault
Bois-Normand-près-Lyre
Les Bottereaux
Breteuil
Broglie
Capelle-les-Grands
Chaise-Dieu-du-Theil
Chamblac
Chambord
La Chapelle-Gauthier
Chéronvilliers
Ferrières-Saint-Hilaire
La Goulafrière
Grand-Camp
La Haye-Saint-Sylvestre
Juignettes
Le Lesme
Marbois
Mélicourt
Mesnil-Rousset
Mesnils-sur-Iton (partly)
Montreuil-l'Argillé
Neaufles-Auvergny
La Neuve-Lyre
Notre-Dame-du-Hamel
Rugles
Saint-Agnan-de-Cernières
Saint-Antonin-de-Sommaire
Saint-Aubin-du-Thenney
Saint-Denis-d'Augerons
Sainte-Marie-d'Attez
Saint-Jean-du-Thenney
Saint-Laurent-du-Tencement
Saint-Pierre-de-Cernières
La Trinité-de-Réville
Verneuil d'Avre et d'Iton (partly)
Verneusses
La Vieille-Lyre

References

Cantons of Eure